Princess Alexandra School is a school located in Hay River, Northwest Territories, Canada providing public education for students in grades 4 through 7. The administration of the school is the responsibility of the South Slave Divisional Education Council (SSDEC).

Background
The school is named after Princess Alexandra, The Honourable Lady Ogilvy, a cousin to Queen Elizabeth II. The school was officially opened by the royal after its construction was completed in summer 1967.

Recognition and awards
In August 2012, Princess Alexandra Literacy Coach Dorie Hanson was awarded an Excellent in Education Award by the South Slave Divisional Education Council for her work in contributing to the ongoing literacy improvements being experienced at the school

References

External links
Princess Alexandra at the South Slave Divisional Education Council

Elementary schools in the Northwest Territories
1967 establishments in the Northwest Territories
Educational institutions established in 1967